The Battle of Ardnaree, was a battle in the Tudor conquest of Ireland fought at Ardnaree (now a suburb of Ballina, County Mayo) on 23 September 1586. The result was a victory for the English over the Mac Philbins and Burkes. The conflict was a part of the political and military struggle, involving the English and occasionally the Scots, for control of northern Ireland.
Ardnaree the anglicised version of the name can be translated to Árd na ríogh meaning the hill of the kings.

The Mac Philbins and Mayo Burkes had risen in revolt against English rule in Ireland. An Irish-Scottish mercenary army, led by Donnell Gorm MacDonnell of Carey and Alexander Carragh MacDonnell of Glenarm, sons of the deceased James MacDonald, 6th of Dunnyveg, were invited into Connacht by the Burkes to attack English settlements and forces. The mercenary army was fronted at Sligo, Coolony and Ballingafad by English forces for over fourteen days.

Sir Richard Bingham, the governor of Connacht, followed the mercenary force to Ardnaree, where the mercenary force had camped on the east (right) bank of the River Moy. Bingham's forces surrounded the camp at night and attacked the occupants. During the battle 1,000 mercenaries were killed, including Donnell Gorm MacDonnell of Carey and Alexander Carragh MacDonnell of Glenarm. Also slaughtered were some 1000 men, women and children in the camp.

Richard Bingham went on to hang the leaders of the Burkes, with the former lands of Mac Philbins and Mayo Burkes given to English settlers.

See also
 List of Irish battles

Notes

Sources
 The Oxford Companion to Irish History

References

1586 in Ireland
Conflicts in 1586
Clan Donald
Military history of County Antrim
16th-century military history of the Kingdom of England
Elizabethan era
England–Ireland relations
Ireland–Scotland relations